The Pacific National Exhibition (PNE) is a nonprofit organization that operates an annual 15-day summer fair, 10-day winter fair, a seasonal amusement park, and indoor arenas in Vancouver, British Columbia, Canada. The PNE fair is held at Hastings Park, beginning in mid-to-late August and ending in early September, usually Labour Day, and in mid-December until Christmas. 

The organization was established in 1907 as the Vancouver Exhibition Association, and organized its first fair at Hastings Park in 1910. The organization was renamed to the Pacific National Exhibition in 1946. During the mid-20th century, a number of facilities were built on the PNE grounds, including Pacific Coliseum and the PNE Agrodome. In 1993, the amusement park adjacent to the PNE, Playland, became a division of the PNE.

History
The Vancouver Exhibition Association (VEA), the predecessor to the Pacific National Exhibition organization was first formed in 1907; although the association was not incorporated until 18 June 1908. The VEA had petitioned Vancouver City Council to host a fair at Hastings Park; although faced early opposition from the city council and the local jockey club that used the park for horse races. However, the city council eventually conceded to the VEA's request and granted the association a 5-year lease to host a fair at Hastings Park in 1909.

The VEA held its first fair at Hastings Park in August 1910. It was opened by then Canadian Prime Minister Sir Wilfrid Laurier as the Vancouver Exhibition. The biggest attractions of the two-week fair are its numerous shops, stalls, performances, a nightly fireworks show, and the exhibition's Prize Home. From its beginnings, the exhibition was used as a showcase for the region's agriculture and economy.

In the initial years of the Second World War, the fairgrounds saw an increased military presence. However, the exhibition itself was not cancelled until 1942, after the Canadian declaration of war against Japan was issued. From 1942 to 1946 the exhibition and fair was closed, and like the Canadian National Exhibition in Toronto, served as a military training facility for the duration of World War II. During this time, the exhibition barns that were used to house livestock, were used as processing centres for interned Japanese Canadians from all over British Columbia. The interned Japanese Canadians were later shipped away to other internment camps throughout British Columbia, and Alberta. The Momiji (Japanese word for Maple) Gardens on the PNE's grounds serves as a memorial for the event. The barns used for the internment of Japanese Canadians are still used to house livestock during the annual fair, and serve as storage area to house some of the PNE's property the rest of the year. 

On 7 February 1946, the Vancouver Exhibition Association changed its name to its current moniker, the Pacific National Exhibition; and later reopened the fair to the public under that name in 1947. The organization was formally reincorporated as the Pacific National Exhibition in 1955.

The highest attendance at the fair was recorded in 1986, with 1.1 million guests visiting the PNE, most likely due to Expo 86 that was occurring at the time. In 1993, the amusement park adjacent to the PNE, Playland, became a division of the PNE organization.

During 1997-1998, the PNE grounds was transformed with the demolition of a number of buildings including the Food Building, Showmart and the Poultry Building. This gave way to the Sanctuary, a parkland setting with a pond. The pond restored part of a stream that once flowed in the park out to the Burrard Inlet. The city restored a large portion of the park. Many old fair buildings have been demolished and replaced by a more natural character. Although land was purchased in Surrey that was to become the fair's new home, the PNE has since transferred ownership from the province to the City of Vancouver and will remain at Hastings Park. The PNE is a registered charity.

Two attractions at the PNE were named as heritage sites by the City of Vancouver in August 2013. The Pacific Coliseum and the Wooden Roller Coaster were added to the list.

In 2020, the fair went on hiatus due to the COVID-19 pandemic, alongside other agricultural and county fairs across Canada, including the Calgary Stampede, the Canadian National Exhibition, and K-Days.

In the early hours of February 20, 2022, a major fire broke out on PNE grounds, where multiple vehicles, tools and equipment, and buildings were destroyed as a result.

Grounds

The PNE grounds maintains several gardens and natural preserves on the grounds including The Sanctuary; a small pond that serves as a resting place and breeding ground for approximately 130 species of birds. Gardens at the PNE grounds includes an Italian garden and Momiji Commemorative Garden; the latter serving as a memorial for the internment of Japanese Canadians during World War II. Another memorial located on the park grounds is dedicated to the 29th Battalion, (Vancouver), CEF, an infantry battalion whose lineage is perpetuated by the British Columbia Regiment (Duke of Connaught's Own).

Approximately  of Hastings Park is not managed by the Pacific National Exhibition. This includes Hastings Racecourse, a  facility operated by Great Canadian Gaming; and several facilities maintained by the municipal government, including Empire Field, an emergency dispatch centre, and local community centre.

Structures

The PNE grounds contains several buildings and exhibition halls. The PNE Forum is a  exhibition facility that is used for large displays and trade shows. Rollerland is a  exhibition, banquet hall and venue for the Terminal City Roller Derby. 

Two buildings on the PNE grounds are indoor arenas. The Pacific Coliseum is multi-purpose arena that holds 15,713 permanent seats, with provisions for 2,000 temporary seats for concerts and certain sports. The PNE Agrodome is a smaller indoor arena with 3,000 permanent seats, with provisions to expand up to 5,000 seats. Entertainment facilities includes the Garden Auditorium, a building that features a built-in stage and dance hall. The PNE grounds also feature amphitheatre with bench-style seating for 4,500 visitors.

Other buildings on the PNE grounds includes the Livestock Barns, a large multi-use facility, and the organization's administrative offices.

Demolished buildings 

 Armed Services Display Building (1950s)
 Aquarium
 Athletic Field (1910)
 Baby Dipper
 Band Stand
 1950s BC Pavilion; later BC Sports Hall of Fame
 Dining Hall
 Dip the Dips (1915)
 Directors' Dining Room
 Display Barn
 District Display Exhibit
 Empire Stadium (1954); later Empire lot and now Empire Field (and maintained by the Vancouver Parks Board)
 Feed Store
 Ferryboat Wharf (1910)
 Food Building (a.k.a. Pure Foods Building, 1931); now part of the Sanctuary parkland
 Forestry Hall (1913)
 Fountain
 Giant Dipper
 Grandstand (1910)
 Green House
 Happyland Carousel Building
 Horticultural Building
 Industrial Building (1910); later as the Women's Building
 Livestock Judging Pavilion
 Manufacturers' Building; also Machinery Hall and later Transportation Building (1910)
 Mineral Exhibit
 Miniature Railway
 Post Office
 Poultry & Pigeon building (1950s)
 Press Bureau
 Pure Foods Building (1931) now the Italian Gardens
 Race Track and Stables (around 1905)
 Racing Paddock
 Refreshment Stands
 Sheep Stables
 Shoot the Chutes
 Showmart (1931); now part of the Italian Gardens
 Skid Road (Midway) (1910)
 Stable Restaurant
 Stock Judging Building
 Streetcar Station (1910)
 Swine Building (1950s)
 Vaudeville Stage

Access

The PNE grounds has several entrances or "gates," including the red gate off East Hastings Street and Renfrew Street, and the purple gate off East Hastings Street. Both gates are situated in the southern portion of the PNE grounds, with the latter gate also the main entrance to Playland. Several gates are located in the northern portion of the PNE grounds, with the yellow gate situated off Renfrew Street near the Pacific Coliseum, while the green gate is located along Miller Drive.

There exists several parking lots on site, with two parking lots off Renfrew Street and another off Bridgeway Street. The PNE also operates another parking lot south of Playland, across East Hastings. The PNE also operates a valet service for cyclists.

See also
 List of festivals in Canada
 List of festivals in British Columbia
 List of festivals in Vancouver

Notes

References

External links

 

Festivals in Vancouver
Recurring events established in 1910
1910 establishments in British Columbia
Exhibitions in Canada
Fairs in British Columbia
Hastings Park
Festivals established in 1910
Summer events in Canada